Ialpujeni is a commune in Cimișlia District, Moldova. It is composed of two villages, Ialpujeni and Marienfeld, the latter called Pervomaisc during the Soviet period.

References

Communes of Cimișlia District